Río Negro (Black River) is a province of Argentina, located in northern Patagonia. Neighboring provinces are from the south clockwise Chubut, Neuquén, Mendoza, La Pampa and Buenos Aires. To the east lies the Atlantic Ocean.

Its capital is Viedma near the Atlantic outlet of the province's namesake river in the eastern extreme. The largest city is in the Andean foothills Bariloche in the far west. Other important cities include General Roca and Cipolletti.

History
Ferdinand Magellan was the first European explorer to visit the coasts of the provinces in 1520. Italian priest Nicolás Mascardi founded the Jesuit mission Nuestra Señora de Nahuel Huapi in 1670 at the shore of the Nahuel Huapi Lake, at the feet of the Andes range.

Originally part of the Argentine territory called Patagonia (in 1878 the Gobernación de la Patagonia), in 1884 it was organised into the Territorio Nacional del Río Negro and General Lorenzo Vintter was appointed as the territory's first governor. It was only in 1957, that Río Negro acquired status of a province; its first provincial governor was Edgardo Castello of the Radical Civic Union (UCR).

Geography

Río Negro is one of the six provinces that make up Argentine Patagonia. It is bounded to the north by the Colorado River which separates it from La Pampa Province, to the east by the Atlantic Ocean and to the west by the Andes and the Limay River (serves as the natural border with Neuquén Province). The 42nd parallel south marks the southern limit of the province.

Climate

The climate of the province is temperate at low elevations, and very cold in the higher Andean peaks.

Temperature
The mean annual temperatures in the province are relatively cold for its latitude owing to the marine currents to the east and higher altitude to the west. Mean annual temperatures in the province can vary, depending on altitude and distance from the sea. At the highest peaks, the mean annual temperature is less than freezing.

Humidity and precipitation
Relative humidity is lower in the central plateau where they average 50%. Along the coastal regions, humidity is higher with a mean annual humidity of 60% while the Andean region has the highest humidity with an average annual humidity exceeding 65% due to the lower temperatures there. In all locations, humidity is lower in the summer and higher in the winter owing to the higher temperatures in the summer.

Coastal areas and northern parts of the province receive a slightly higher precipitation, where it can average above  a year. In some places, precipitation can exceed  a year. Most of the Andean region has a rainfall pattern that is Mediterranean like, similar to Central Chile in which most of the precipitation falls during the winter months and summers are dry.

Wind and sunshine
One dominant characteristic of the climate is the strong winds that are observed throughout the province. Summers tend to be windier than winters. Winds coming from the west, southwest and northwest are common, occurring 50% of the time (60% if calm winds are not included). The mean wind speed throughout the province varies with the northern parts having the lowest wind speeds while the highest altitude areas being the windiest. Except for the northern parts of the province, mean annual wind speeds exceed .

Cloud cover varies throughout the province, ranging from more than 60% in the Andean region to about 40% in the coastal areas. The central plateaus have intermediate amounts of cloud cover between these 2 regions. As such, the Andean region is cloudier than the rest of the province. Sunshine ranges from 10–11 hours of sunshine/day in January to about 5 hours of sunshine/day (less cloudier areas) to less than 3 hours of sunshine/day (more cloudier areas) in July.

Demographics

It constitutes 1.6% of the total population in Argentina. Amongst of all the provinces in Patagonia, it is the most populous, containing 30.4% of the total population in Patagonia.

The province is home to four indigenous groups: The Tehuelches, the Puelches, the Pehuenches, and the Mapuches. Almost all of the indigenous population in the province are the Mapuches with the rest being small in number where their few descendants live in the neighbouring provinces. The Mapuches along with some of the Pehuenches originally lived in the western parts of the province although today, they mainly live in the southern parts of the province. The Tehuelches were nomadic people that hunted on the steppes in the province. The Puelches, being also nomadic, lived on the northern margins of Nahuel Huapi Lake and the surrounding forests in the Andean mountains, living off hunting and fishing. It is estimated that Mapuches started coming to the region before 1880 from Chile, leading to the imposition of their culture onto the other indigenous groups. Originally agricultural people, the Mapuches became nomadic upon arrival to the province due to the utilization of horses.

The province received immigrants mostly from Chile, Italy, Spain, Germany and the United Kingdom during the last years of the 19th century and the first years of the 20th century.

Government

The provincial government is divided into the usual three branches: the executive, headed by a popularly elected governor, who appoints the cabinet; the legislative; and the judiciary, headed by the Supreme Court.

As of December 2019, Arabela Carreras became governor of the province, following the retirement of Alberto Weretilneck due to term-limit. She is the first woman elected governor of the province.

The Constitution of Río Negro Province forms the formal law of the province.

In Argentina, the most important law enforcement organization is the Argentine Federal Police but the additional work is carried out by the Río Negro Provincial Police.

Political division

The province is divided into 13 departments:

Department (Capital)

 Adolfo Alsina Department (Viedma)
 Avellaneda Department (Choele Choel)
 Bariloche Department (San Carlos de Bariloche)
 Conesa Department (General Conesa)
 El Cuy Department (El Cuy)
 General Roca Department (General Roca)
 9 de Julio Department (Sierra Colorada)
 Ñorquinco Department (Ñorquincó)
 Pichi Mahuida Department (Río Colorado)
 Pilcaniyeu Department (Pilcaniyeu)
 San Antonio Department (San Antonio Oeste)
 Valcheta Department (Valcheta)
 25 de Mayo Department (Maquinchao)

Source for department names:

Economy
Argentina's ninth-largest, Rio Negro's economy is a diversified service-based one with vigorous agricultural and light manufacturing sectors. Its 2006 output was an estimated US$5.420 billion, or a per capita income of US$9,805. In 2013, its output increased to $43.349 billion Pesos (about US$7.939 billion) at current market prices.

There is a gold mine located at Calcatreu, near Ingeniero Jacobacci, owned by Pan American Silver. in December 2011 the provincial government repealed a law banning the use of cyanide in mineral processing, and the mine's owners regarded this as a positive development which is likely to bring increased investment.

Tourism

There are two main areas of tourism in the province; the Andes and the Atlantic coast.

The Andean Area
The most visited area is that of the lake district near San Carlos de Bariloche
inside the Nahuel Huapi National Park, and neighbouring Neuquén Province. This includes the Isla Victoria, Camino de los Siete Lagos, Los Arrayanes National Park, and many trekking paths among lakes.

The Atlantic Coast

Returns of southern right whales are possibly the biggest of tourism attractions. They swim and rest very close to shore, and the San Matías Gulf is the only place in the world where swimming with this kind is commercially permitted.

Villages

References

Notes

External links

—Official Río Negro Province website
Pictures of Río Negro Province 

 
Provinces of Argentina
Patagonia
Wine regions of Argentina
States and territories established in 1957
1957 establishments in Argentina